Edmond De Knibber was a Belgian archer. He competed at the 1920 Summer Olympics, winning three medals, two gold and a silver.

References

Year of birth missing
Year of death missing
Belgian male archers
Olympic archers of Belgium
Archers at the 1920 Summer Olympics
Place of birth missing
Olympic gold medalists for Belgium
Olympic silver medalists for Belgium
Olympic medalists in archery
Medalists at the 1920 Summer Olympics
20th-century Belgian people